"Bulleya" (Urdu: بللیہ ) is a song by the Pakistani sufi rock band Junoon, released in 1999. It is the first track from the band's fifth album, Parvaaz (1999), recorded at Abbey Road Studios, London and released on EMI Records. The song is a famous kafi written by the sufi saint Bulleh Shah. Bulleh Shah is famous for his spiritual and metaphysical poetry, and Bullah Ki Jaana (the poem on which the song is based) is one of his well-known poems. The song is composed and produced by lead guitarist and founder of the band Salman Ahmad. It is the lead single on the album, the song uses blending of rock guitars and bluesy vocals with eastern elements like the use of tablas, raga-inspired melodies and traditional Pakistani folk music. 
 
It is considered one of the best sufi rock songs ever recorded by Junoon, and is often performed at concerts. The song is one of the most well known and popular track by Junoon, also listeners and critics have continued to praise "Bulleya" as one of the greatest rock songs of all time in Pakistani music industry.

In addition, a new version, named "Bulleya/Lonely Heart", with addition of English lyrics to the song featured in the soundtrack album Rock & Roll Jihad, released in 2010. The song has also featured in several other albums by the band like Junoon for Peace (2001), United for Peace (2001) and Dewaar: The Best of Junoon (2004).

Conception

Background
Bullah Ki Jaana is a Kafi written by the sufi saint Bulleh Shah, famous for his spiritual and metaphysical poetry, Bullah Ki Jaana is one of his well-known poems. While reciting Kafis, Bulleh Shah would go on dancing continuously, till he attained the stage of haal (divine ecstasy).

In his poem, Bullah Shah is expressing the relationship between Man and God. Also, Bulleh Shah contemplates the origins of mankind using himself as a metaphor. He expresses doubts about previously held views of the emergence of humans on Earth. He reasons, by referring to himself, that one can never understand the laws of nature and one's place in the Universe.

Track listing
Bulleya

Cover versions
Pakistani rock band Call performed a live session cover of Junoon's hit song "Bulleya" on Indus Music. 
In 2005, Rabbi Shergill's covered a  rock/fusion version of the song, which became a chart-topper in India.
In 2009, Riaz Ali Khan performed a rendition of the song at the Coke Studio Season Two.

Personnel

Junoon
Salman Ahmad - vocals, lead guitar
Ali Azmat - vocals, backing vocals
Brian O'Connell - bass guitar, backing vocals

Additional musicians
Ustad Aashiq Ali Mir - dholak, tabla

See also
Bullah Ki Jaana
Bulleh Shah
"Bulleya" song in Ae Dil Hai Mushkil
"Bulleya" song in Sultan (2016 film)

References

External links
 Junoon Official Website
 Bulleya Official Lyrics

1999 singles
Junoon (band) songs
1999 songs
EMI Records singles
Punjabi-language songs
Pakistani rock songs